ARTES 20 Integrated Applications Promotion (IAP) is a European Space Agency programme that supports the development of services utilizing two or more space assets, such as satellite navigation, communication or earth observation, with terrestrial systems. Projects are focused on creating user-driven applications around solving particular problems or opportunities instead of creating a technological solutions.

Integrated Applications Promotion Programme was approved on ESA ministerial conference in November 2008 as a new branch of Advanced Research in Telecommunications Systems programme. Ambassadors platform was opened in May 2010 aiming to further expand awareness of the programme in Eastern and Central Europe. Till September 2014 ESA supported 108 projects in ARTES 20 programme.

Activities 
Programme is divided between three types of activities:

Open Competitions 
Standard procedure of placing contracts with ESA focused around satisfying particular needs of ESA or collaborating institutions while working with a fixed budget and time schedule. Projects cover Feasibility Studies and Demonstrations.

Calls for Proposals 
Projects working with no fixed budget or closing date co-funded by ESA up to 50% in case of commercial applications and up to 100% in case of research institutions and universities. Calls of Proposals are divided into 3 major categories, all closing on 31 July 2016.
 Feasibility Studies for identification, analyzation and a definition of sustainable applications and services by utilization of a multiple space data.
 Fast Track Feasibility Studies are focusing on a few selected critical elements of a feasibility studies while being limited in funding and duration.
 Demonstration Projects for pre-operational services with clear sustainability perspective.

Awareness Activities 
Special awards on selected topics and a calls for ideas including these open for everyone interested, with no additional requirements.

See also
 ARTES
 European Centre for Space Applications and Telecommunications (ECSAT)

References

External links
IAP website
ARTES 20 Projects list

European Space Agency